Clohamon is a small, rural village and townland near Bunclody in County Wexford, Ireland. Located on the River Slaney, Clonmahon's bridge dates to the late 18th or early 19th century. Previously the site of a large mill, there is now a meat processing factory (operated by Slaney Foods) in Clohamon.

See also
 List of towns and villages in Ireland

References

Towns and villages in County Wexford